4944 Kozlovskij, provisional designation , is a carbonaceous Witt asteroid from the central regions of the asteroid belt, approximately  in diameter. It was discovered on 2 September 1987, by Soviet astronomer Lyudmila Chernykh at the Crimean Astrophysical Observatory in Nauchnij, on the Crimean peninsula. The asteroid was named for Russian opera singer Ivan Kozlovsky.

Classification 

Kozlovskij is a member of the Witt family, a large family of (predominantly) stony asteroids with more than 1,600 known members. It orbits the Sun in the central main-belt at a distance of 2.6–2.9 AU once every 4 years and 7 months (1,661 days; semi-major axis of 2.75 AU). Its orbit has an eccentricity of 0.06 and an inclination of 4° with respect to the ecliptic. The asteroid's observation arc begins 36 years prior to its official discovery observation, with a precovery taken at Palomar Observatory in December 1951.

Physical characteristics 

In the SMASS classification, Kozlovskij is a Cb-type asteroid, an intermediary between the carbonaceous C-type and the somewhat brighter B-type asteroids.

Lightcurves 

In October 2010, a rotational lightcurve of Kozlovskij was obtained from photometric observations in the R-band by astronomers at the Palomar Transient Factory in California. Lightcurve analysis gave a rotation period of 3.573 hours with a brightness amplitude of 0.46 magnitude.

Diameter and albedo 

According to the surveys carried out by the Japanese Akari satellite and the NEOWISE mission of NASA's Wide-field Infrared Survey Explorer (WISE), Kozlovskij measures 9.25 and 9.89 kilometers in diameter and its surface has an albedo of 0.157 and 0.09, respectively. Preliminary WISE results gave a larger diameter of 10.85 and 11.125 kilometers with lower albedo of 0.086 and 0.061, respectively.

The Collaborative Asteroid Lightcurve Link assumes a standard albedo for carbonaceous asteroids of 0.057 and calculates a diameter of 9.91 kilometers based on an absolute magnitude of 13.75.

Naming 

This minor planet was named after Russian opera singer Ivan Kozlovsky (1900–1993), who was a rare lyric tenor and a popular singer in the former Soviet Union. The approved naming citation was published by the Minor Planet Center on 1 September 1993.

References

External links 
 Asteroid Lightcurve Database (LCDB), query form (info )
 Dictionary of Minor Planet Names, Google books
 Asteroids and comets rotation curves, CdR – Observatoire de Genève, Raoul Behrend
 Discovery Circumstances: Numbered Minor Planets (1)-(5000) – Minor Planet Center
 
 

004944
Discoveries by Lyudmila Chernykh
Named minor planets
004944
19870902